Ibrahim Al-Shehri (born 23 February 1996) is a Saudi Arabian footballer who plays for Al-Lewaa as a winger and left back.

References

External links

Living people
1996 births
Saudi Arabian footballers
Ittihad FC players
Al-Ain FC (Saudi Arabia) players
Al-Jabalain FC players
Al-Nojoom FC players
Al-Kawkab FC players
Al Jeel Club players
Al-Washm Club players
Al-Lewaa Club players
Saudi Professional League players
Saudi First Division League players
Saudi Second Division players
Association football wingers
Association football fullbacks